Tim Place is an American football coach. He served as head football coach at Chowan University in Murfreesboro, North Carolina from 2008 - 2019. Prior to his arrival at Chowan, Place was the head football coach at Urbana University in Urbana, Ohio for two seasons (2006–2007), tallying an 11–11 record.

Head coaching record

College

References

External links

Year of birth missing (living people)
Living people
Chowan Hawks football coaches
Eureka Red Devils football coaches
Hartwick Hawks football coaches
Urbana Blue Knights football coaches
Washington and Lee Generals football players
High school football coaches in North Carolina
High school football coaches in Ohio